The Golden Mosque, or Sunehri Masjid, is a mosque in Chandni Chowk of Old Delhi. It is located outside the southwestern corner of Delhi Gate of the Red Fort, opposite the Netaji Subhash Park.

History 
The mosque was constructed between 1747 and 1751 by the order of Qudsia Begum for Nawab Bahadur Javed Khan, a nobleman during the reign of the Emperor Ahmad Shah Bahadur. Qudsia Begum was the mother of Emperor Ahmad Shah Bahadur. Javed Khan was the supervisor of the harem and was in great favour with the begum and therefore was very influential. He was later assassinated. The Sunehri Masjid is made of bassee jung, a light salmon-coloured stone not usually used for building mosques, which gives the building a singular and picturesque appearance.

Nawab Ahmad Bakhsh Khan, father of the Nawab of Firozpur, repaired the mosque to benefit the neighbourhood. Not long after its renovation, Nawab Ahmad Bakhsh Khan was attacked by an infuriated elephant while out with his son. His horse was killed in the attack, and his vehicle was destroyed. The Nawab and his son were only saved from death by taking refuge inside this mosque.

Architecture 
The mosque is surmounted by three domes, which were originally gilt with copper from which it derives its name. The mosque has a main prayer hall and two minarets. The central arch of the mosque bears an inscription about the builder of the mosque and date of its construction. In 1852, Bahadur Shah II had the mosque repaired and replaced the copper plates of the domes with sandstone facing.

See also 
 Qudsia Bagh
 Sunehri Masjid (Chandni Chowk)
 Sunehri Masjid (Lahore)

References

External links 

Mosques in Delhi
Mosque buildings with domes
Red Fort
Mosques completed in 1751
1751 establishments in India
Mughal mosques
Monuments of National Importance in Delhi